Amy Winehouse: Back to Black is a 2018 documentary film about English singer Amy Winehouse and the making of her second studio album, Back to Black (2006). It contains new interviews, as well as archive footage.

Directed by Jeremy Marre, the film was first broadcast on BBC Four on 14 September 2018 (on what would have been Winehouse's 35th birthday) as part of the Classic Albums documentary series. It was released on DVD, Blu-ray and digitally on 2 November 2018 by Eagle Vision.

The film is accompanied by An Intimate Evening in London, featuring footage of a performance by Winehouse at Riverside Studios in London in February 2008.

Contributors
 Amy Winehouse (archive footage)
 Mark Ronson
 Salaam Remi
 Tom Elmhirst
 Darcus Beese
 Nick Shymansky
 Juliette Ashby
 Dionne Bromfield
 Ronnie Spector

An Intimate Evening in London
The documentary film is accompanied by An Intimate Evening in London, consisting of previously unseen footage of a performance by Winehouse at Riverside Studios in London in February 2008. It was a private show given for family, friends and record company executives on the night she won five Grammy Awards.

See also
 Amy (2015)

References

External links
 
 

2018 films
2018 documentary films
2018 television films
2010s English-language films
Amy Winehouse
British documentary films
British television films
Documentary films about singers
Documentary films about women in music
Television series by BBC Studios
2010s British films